Res publica is a Latin phrase meaning "public issue" or "public matter".

Res publica may also refer to:
Res Publica (journal), a journal published by the Association for Social and Political Philosophy
 , a Polish cultural-political magazine, published 1979-1981 and 1987-1992 and then as,
 , 1992-2002
Res Publica (US), a former US-based global civic advocacy group that co-founded Avaaz
Res Publica University, a former university in Jakarta, Indonesia
Res Publica, a defunct journal published by the Centre for Applied Philosophy and Public Ethics, Australia
De re publica, a dialogue by Cicero
Republic, a type of state, deriving its name from the Latin phrase
ResPublica, a political think tank in the UK
Roman Republic, an ancient polity, preceding the Roman Empire
Union for the Republic - Res Publica, a former Estonian political party
Respublica, a Kazakh political party
Rzeczpospolita

See also
 Respublika (disambiguation)